= Jokahra =

Jokahra is a village situated in Tehsil- Sagri, District -Azamgarh State- Uttar Pradesh, India 36 km away from Azamgarh city on SH-66 nearby market Kankhbhar. 1.5 km from kankhbhar market on Jokahra road towards west. Village have 600 family residing in it with population around 4000 people. It has got its own Post Office having Pincode 276136. Wardha, Maharashtra. Government Inter college named Sri Mahanth Ramashray Das Inter College.
